Trachea auriplena is a species of moth of the family Noctuidae. It is found in Taiwan, China, India, Sri Lanka and Malaysia.

The wingspan is 42–49 mm.

References

Moths described in 1857
Hadeninae
Moths of Asia